Pedioplanis husabensis, also known commonly as the Husab sand lizard, is a species of lizard in the family Lacertidae. The species is endemic to Namibia.

Geographic range
P. husabensis is found in the central portion of the Namib desert in Namibia.

Reproduction
P. husabensis is oviparous.

References

Further reading
Berger-Dell'Mour HAE, Mayer W (1989). "On the parapatric existence of two species of the Pedioplanis undata group (Reptilia: Sauria: Lacertidae) in the central Namib desert (Southwest Africa) with the description of the new species Pedioplanis husabensis ". Herpetozoa 1 (3/4): 83–95. (in English, with an abstract in German).
Branch, Bill (2004). Field Guide to Snakes and other Reptiles of Southern Africa. Third Revised Edition, Second impression. Sanibel Island, Florida: Ralph Curtis Books. 399 pp. . (Pedioplanis husabensis, p. 174 + Plate 58).
Cunningham P, Wassenaar T, Henschel J (2012). "Notes on some aspects of the ecology of the Husab Sand Lizard, Pedioplanis husabensis, from Namibia". African Herp News, Newsletter of the Herpetological Association of Africa (56): 1–11.

Pedioplanis
Lacertid lizards of Africa
Reptiles of Namibia
Endemic fauna of Namibia
Reptiles described in 1989
Taxa named by Hartwig A.E. Berger-Dell'mour
Taxa named by Werner Mayer (herpetologist)